The Djiboutian Republican Guard, is a section of the Djiboutian Armed Forces that provides security missions for the highest Djiboutian state authorities and the public. It is under the direct authority of the President of Djibouti. The unit is traditionally relied on as the backbone of the government, and the unit is the best armed and trained in the armed forces. It is the most powerful security unit in Djibouti and is responsible for ensuring internal security.

See also
Republican Guard (Egypt)
Republican Guard (Ethiopia)
Republican Guard (Yemen)

Sources

Military of Djibouti